Glenn Murdock (born June 25, 1956) is a former justice of the Alabama Supreme Court, who was first elected to that court in 2006 and re-elected in 2012. 
He was previously elected in 2000 to a six-year term on Alabama's Court of Civil Appeals.

References

External links

1956 births
Alabama Republicans
Living people
People from Enterprise, Alabama
Justices of the Supreme Court of Alabama
University of Alabama alumni
University of Virginia School of Law alumni